Infidel Art is the second studio album by the Japanese black metal band Sigh. Considered a maturation of their overall sound the songs on this album are longer and more atmospheric than those on Sigh's previous effort Scorn Defeat; five of the album's six songs exceed the eight-minute mark.

Track listing

Reissue
On June 17, 2013, the album was reissued by Canadian label Virus Production on cassette as part of a boxed set that also included three cassettes of live recordings from early 1990s Sigh shows.

Tape I - Infidel Art 
"Izuna" - 8:16
"The Zombie Terror" - 9:43
"Desolation" - 8:03
"The Last Elegy" - 10:30
"Suicidogenic" - 4:46
"Beyond Centuries" - 9:38

Tape II - Nishi-ogikubo Turning, Tokyo November 28, 1990 
"Weakness Within"
"Evil Dead"
"Desolation of My Mind"
"Sigh"
"Psycho"
"Mentally Numb"
"Death Throes"
"Schizo"
"Desolation of My Mind"
"Sigh"

Tape III - Live at Harajuku Los Angeles, Tokyo August 26, 1991 
"The Knell"
"Death Throes"
"Mentally Numb"
"Desolation of My Mind"
"Weakness Within"

Tape IV - Music Farm, Nagoya Oct 2nd '94
"Intro - Black Metal"
"Seven Gates of Hell"
"Suicidogenic"
"Schizo"
"Taste Defeat"
"Poison"
"Witching Hour"

Personnel
Mirai Kawashima – bass, keyboard, synthesizer, vocals
Shinichi Ishikawa – acoustic guitar, electric guitar
Satoshi Fujinami – drums, percussion

Notes and references

1995 albums
Sigh (band) albums